Bonnie Rock is a small town in the Wheatbelt region of Western Australia.

The town was once the terminus of the railway to Beacon.

The name of the town originated from a rock formation that is situated close to the town, that was named by a sandalwood cutter. The townsite was gazetted in 1932.

A short-lived newspaper in the 1930s included the name of the town in its title.

The main industry in the town is wheat farming, with the town being a Cooperative Bulk Handling receival site.

The Russian adventurer Fyodor Konyukhov broke the record for the fastest circumnavigation of the Earth in a hot air balloon in just over 11 days, landing safely near Bonnie Rock at about 4.30pm (local time) on 23 July 2016.

References 

Wheatbelt (Western Australia)
Grain receival points of Western Australia